Telegraph Road may refer to:

Streets

 Telegraph Road (Los Angeles), in Los Angeles County, California 
 Telegraph Road (Ventura County, California), partly carrying California State Route 126 
 Telegraph Road (Anne Arundel County, Maryland), carrying Maryland Route 170
 Telegraph Road (Michigan), in the Metro Detroit area, carrying U.S. Highway 24
 Telegraph Road (St. Louis County, Missouri), carrying Missouri Route 231
 Telegraph Road (Northern Virginia), carrying State Route 241 and State Route 611
 Old Wire Road (Missouri and Arkansas), historically known as the Telegraph Road

Music
Telegraph Road (album), a 1996 album by Sonny Moorman
"Telegraph Road" (song), a song on the Dire Straits 1982 album Love over Gold

See also
Telegraph Avenue, in Alameda County, California